DS-39 was a Soviet medium machine gun, designed by Vasily Degtyaryov, that was used during the Second World War.  The work on the gun's design began in 1930, and it was accepted by the Red Army in September, 1939. About 10,000 were made from 1939 to 1941, but the weapon was not successful in service and its production was discontinued after the German invasion began in June, 1941, with factories converted to produce the older, more reliable PM M1910 (a WWI-era Maxim machine gun design) which was in turn replaced by the SG-43 Goryunov medium machine gun in 1943.

About 200 were captured by Finland in 1941 and issued to Finnish troops.

Users

See also
 List of Russian weaponry

References

External links
 Another information page 
 DS-39 in Finnish service

7.62×54mmR machine guns
Medium machine guns
World War II infantry weapons of the Soviet Union
World War II machine guns
Machine guns of the Soviet Union
Military equipment introduced in the 1930s